John Lewis "Hurri" "Sugar" Cain (November 17, 1908 – August 18, 1977) was an American football player, coach of football, baseball, and tennis, and college athletics administrator. He played college football at the University of Alabama, where he was a three-time All-American and a member of the 1930 national championship team that won the Rose Bowl. Cain served as the head football coach at Southwestern Louisiana Institute, now the University of Louisiana at Lafayette, from 1937 to 1941 and in 1946, compiling a record of 33–19–5. He was also the head baseball coach at Southwestern Louisiana from 1942 to 1944. In 1947, Cain moved to the University of Mississippi to serve as backfield coach for the football team under Johnny Vaught. He was also the head tennis coach at Ole Miss from 1957 to 1973. Cain was elected to the College Football Hall of Fame as a player in 1973. He stood 5'10" and weighed 183 pounds.

College career
Cain was a member of Phi Sigma Kappa at Alabama.

Death
Cain died of leukemia, on August 18, 1977, at Baptist Hospital in Memphis, Tennessee.

Head coaching record

College football

See also
 List of college football head coaches with non-consecutive tenure

References

External links
 
 

1908 births
1977 deaths
American football fullbacks
American football quarterbacks
Alabama Crimson Tide football coaches
Alabama Crimson Tide football players
Louisiana Ragin' Cajuns athletic directors
Louisiana Ragin' Cajuns baseball coaches
Louisiana Ragin' Cajuns football coaches
Ole Miss Rebels football coaches
Ole Miss Rebels men's tennis coaches
High school football coaches in Alabama
All-Southern college football players
College Football Hall of Fame inductees
Coaches of American football from Alabama
Players of American football from Montgomery, Alabama
Baseball coaches from Alabama
Tennis people from Alabama
Deaths from leukemia
Deaths from cancer in Tennessee